Sextant is the eleventh studio album by Herbie Hancock, released in 1973 by Columbia. It is the last album with the Mwandishi-era sextet featuring saxophonist Bennie Maupin, trumpeter Eddie Henderson, trombonist Julian Priester, bassist Buster Williams and drummer Billy Hart. Synthesizer player Patrick Gleeson and percussionist Buck Clarke also appear.

Background
Released on March 30, 1973, Sextant was Herbie Hancock's first album on Columbia Records, and the last with his Mwandishi-era group. The album showcased Hancock's early adoption of synthesizers and electronic effects.

Upon release, the record was considered to be a commercial flop.

Critical reception
AllMusic called the album a "gem" which features "a kind of post-modal, free impressionism while gracing the edges of funk." Rolling Stone wrote that, "taking his cue from [Miles] Davis' swirling, anarchic Bitches Brew and On the Corner, Hancock went even further into outer space [...] much of Sextant, with its twittering, burbling effects, amounts to a primitive version of Nineties ambient music." The album was called an "uncompromising avant-funk masterpiece" by Paste Magazine.

Track listing
All songs by Herbie Hancock

Personnel
 Mwandishi (Herbie Hancock) – piano, Fender Rhodes, clavinet, Mellotron, ARP 2600, ARP Pro Soloist, Moog synthesizer
 Mwile (Bennie Maupin) – soprano saxophone, bass clarinet, piccolo, afuche
 Mganga (Eddie Henderson) – trumpet, flugelhorn
 Pepo (Julian Priester) – bass trombone, tenor trombone, alto trombone, cowbell
 Mchezaji (Buster Williams) – bass guitar, double bass
 Jabali (Billy Hart) – drums
 Patrick Gleeson – ARP 2600, ARP Pro Soloist
 Buck Clarke – percussion

References

External links
 Sextant at Discogs

1973 albums
Columbia Records albums
Herbie Hancock albums
Albums produced by Dave Rubinson
Albums recorded at Wally Heider Studios
Albums with cover art by Mati Klarwein
Jazz fusion albums by American artists